Vili (Civili) is one of the Zone H Bantu languages, grouped with the Kongo clade.

The language has a few thousand native speakers in spread along the coast between southern Gabon and Cabinda, most of them in the Republic of the Congo's Kouilou, Pointe-Noire and Niari departments.
The Vili people (singular Muvili, plural Bavili) were the population of the 17th- to 18th-century Kingdom of Loango in the same region.

References

External links
 Vili at WolframAlpha

Languages of the Republic of the Congo
Languages of Gabon
Kongo language